Syedi Nuruddin, an 11th-century famous saint (death: Jumadi al-Ula 11) and was the Fatimid Ismaili Mustaali Missionary. He was the companion of Maulaya Abdullah (Ismaili Mustaali Missionary) and visited the Imam Al-Mustansir Billah in Cairo, Egypt. He joined the Ismaili Mustaali faith under the Fatimid Da'i Mu'ayyad fi'l-Din al-Shirazi, and came back to Dongaum, Deccan, India to propagate the faith. His earlier name was Roop Nath.  His mausoleum is at Don Gaon, Maharashtra, India.

The a da'i named Ahmad took two the Gujarati orphans (Abdullah and Nuruddin) to Cairo, trained them in the Ismaili doctrine, and sent them back to Gujarat as a missionary.

References

11th-century people from the Fatimid Caliphate
Musta'li Isma'ilism
Indian Muslims
Date of birth uncertain
Date of death unknown
11th-century Ismailis
Ismaili da'is